Hypertragulus is an extinct genus of hypertragulid ruminant endemic to North America.

Hypertragulus were primitive and ancient ruminants, resembling small deer or musk deer, although they were more closely related to modern chevrotains. Its diet is stated to be that of a frugivore.

Species
H. calcaratus 
H. chadronensis
H. crawfordensis
H. dakotensis
H. heikeni
H. hesperius
H. minor
H. minutus
H. planiceps
H. quadratus
H. sequens

Fossil distribution
A partial list of fossil sites:
Chihuahua, Mexico
Cedar Creek Formation (Lower & Middle), Logan County, Colorado
Fort Logan Formation, Meagher County, Montana
Upper Pomerado Conglomerate Formation, San Diego County, California
Turtle Cove Member of the John Day Formation, Grant County, Oregon

References

Eocene even-toed ungulates
Miocene even-toed ungulates
Aquitanian genus extinctions
Oligocene mammals of North America
White River Fauna
Eocene genus first appearances
Prehistoric even-toed ungulate genera